Cape Zebib (Ras Zebib) is a headland in northern Tunisia near the town of Metline. The bay between Cape Guardia and Cape Zebib has the sandy Skala Beach; Skala was also an ancient port. Bizerte stands on the lowest part of the coast, which thence gradually rises to the cape.

Cape Zebib sits at the eastern extremity of Bizerte Road. Near the extremity of the cape, there is a small community. To the south-eastward of Cape Zebib, the coast is low with some cliffs and small beaches. These are bordered by sandy hillocks, a cultivated plain, and the village of Ras Jebel, eastward of which, the wooded hills extend to Jebel Nadur. Some rocks, covered and uncovered, lie off this coast.

References

Zebib